Ottersweier is a municipality in western Baden-Württemberg, Germany. It is part of the district of Rastatt, and lies between the larger towns Bühl and Achern.

Twin cities
 - Westerlo, Flanders, Belgium, since 1962
 - Krauschwitz (Saxony), Germany, since 1989

Sons and daughters of the place
 Joseph Sauer (1872-1949) born in the district of Unzhurst, theologian, Christian archaeologist and art historian
 Bernhard Friedmann (1932–2021), politician (CDU), Member of the Bundestag 1976–1990, President of the European Court of Auditors 1996-1999

References

Rastatt (district)